Fatim Winshett El Habib Diarra (born 1986 Helsinki) is a Finnish politician. She has been a city councilor in Helsinki since 2017, and was elected Chair of the City Council of Helsinki in June 2021. She served as a deputy chairperson of her party Green League from 2019 to 2021.

Diarra chairs Naisasialiitto Unioni, the oldest feminist organization in Finland, and in June 2021 she was elected to the Board of Administration of the European Women’s Lobby (EWL).

She is active also in the Black Lives Matter movement and for body positivity. In the past, Fatim Diarra was active in the scout movement.

References

Living people
1986 births
Finnish feminists
Green League politicians